Songs from the Pale Eclipse is the seventh studio album by The Warlocks. The album was released on Cleopatra Records in September 2016.

Track listing

Personnel 
The Warlocks
Bobby Hecksher - Composer, Bass, Guitar, Keyboards, Liner Notes, Producer, Vocals, Harmonica
Josh Garza - Drums
Earl V. Miller - Guitar
Chris Di Pino - Bass
John Christian Rees - Guitar, Percussion
George Serrano - Drums

Technical/Design
Rod Cervera - Engineer, Mixing, Producer
Eric Debris - Mastering
Adam Lathrum - Engineer, Mixing
Stefan Lirakis - Engineer
Jon Siebels - Engineer
Matt Green - A&R
Steven Olmos - Layout Design, Photography
Korrin Jasmine Stoney - Cover Art

References 

2016 albums
The Warlocks albums
Cleopatra Records albums